A general election was held in the U.S. state of Wyoming on Tuesday, November 4, 1958. All of the state's executive officers—the Governor, Secretary of State, Auditor, Treasurer, and Superintendent of Public Instruction—were up for election. Democrats had a largely good year, picking up the Governorship and the Secretary of State's office and holding the State Superintendent's office, though Republicans were returned as State Auditor and State Treasurer.

Governor

Incumbent Republican Governor Milward Simpson ran for re-election to a second term. He was challenged by Democratic nominee John J. Hickey, the former U.S. Attorney for the District of Wyoming, and by Louis W. Carlson, the former Mayor of Newcastle, who formed the Economy Party to support his pro-gambling platform. Simpson narrowly lost re-election to Hickey, who won a slim plurality as Carlson siphoned away votes.

Secretary of State
Incumbent Republican Secretary of State Everett T. Copenhaver ran for re-election to a second term. After defeating former State Land Commissioner John Riedel in the Republican primary, he faced Democratic nominee Jack R. Gage, the former State Superintendent of Public Instruction from several decades prior. Gage ended up narrowly defeating Copenhaver. During Gage's term as Secretary of State, he would also act as Governor after Governor Hickey appointed himself to the U.S. Senate in 1961.

Democratic primary

Candidates
 Jack R. Gage, former Wyoming Superintendent of Public Instruction

Results

Republican primary

Candidates
 Everett T. Copenhaver, incumbent Secretary of State
 John Riedel, former State Land Commissioner

Results

General election

Results

Auditor
Incumbent Republican State Auditor Minnie A. Mitchell ran for re-election to a second term. She was once again challenged by State Representative Bob Adams, the Democratic nominee, who had also been her challenger four years prior. Adams improved on his performance from 1958, but nonetheless fell short of unseating Mitchell.

Democratic primary

Candidates
 Bob Adams, State Representative from Laramie County

Results

Republican primary

Candidates
 Minnie A. Mitchell, incumbent State Auditor

Results

General election

Results

Treasurer
Incumbent Republican State Treasurer Charles B. Morgan was unable to seek re-election to a second term due to term limits. Former Governor Doc Rogers, who had previously served as State Treasurer, ran to succeed Morgan. He won the Republican primary against State Representative Robert Fair and faced Carl A. Johnson, the Democratic nominee, an accountant from Cheyenne. Owing at least in part to his record of electoral successes, Rogers easily defeated Johnson, returning to the Treasurer's office.

Democratic primary

Candidates
 Carl A. Johnson, Cheyenne accountant
 Ira Whitlock, Worland bank executive

Results

Republican primary

Candidates
 Doc Rogers, former Governor of Wyoming
 Robert J. Fair, State Representative from Sheridan County

Results

General election

Results

Superintendent of Public Instruction
Incumbent Democratic Superintendent of Public Instruction Velma Linford ran for re-election to a second term in office. She faced a challenge from former State Representative Shirley Boice, one of the few women to have been elected to the legislature by that point in history. Linford once again outperformed the rest of the state Democratic ticket and defeated Boice in a landslide to win her second and final term as Superintendent.

Democratic primary

Candidates
 Velma Linford, incumbent Superintendent of Public Instruction

Results

Republican primary

Candidates
 Shirley Boice, former State Representative from Laramie County

Results

General election

Results

References

 
Wyoming